CI or Ci may refer to:

Business terminology
 Customer intelligence, a discipline in marketing
 Competitive intelligence
 Corporate identity
 Continual improvement
 Confidential information

Businesses and organisations

Academia and education
 California State University, Channel Islands
 Channel Islands High School
 Collegium Invisibile
 Confucius Institute

Religion
 Josephites of Belgium, a Catholic congregation
 Christian Identity
 Christian Institute, a British charity which promotes Christian values

Other businesses and organizations
 Charity Intelligence Canada
 China Airlines (IATA code)
 Cigna health services (NYSE symbol)
 Consumers International
 Cycling Ireland
 CI Records, a music record label
 Cambria and Indiana Railroad
 CANZUK International, organisation which promotes cooperation between Canada, Australia, New Zealand and the United Kingdom
 Conservation International, an international environmental non-governmental organization
 Communications International, a former global union federation
 Communist International
 Children International, a non-profit child sponsorship organization

Law and military
 Counterintelligence
 Confidential informant
 Compliance Inspection, a United States Air Force inspection
 Chief inspector, a police rank
 Certificate of identity
 Civilian Internee, a special status of a prisoner during wartime
 Civilian Instructor, an adult volunteer in the British Air Training Corps

Places
 Ci County, in Hebei, China
 Cayman Islands
 Chile (FIPS country code, obsolete NATO country code)
 Coney Island
 Cocos (Keeling) Islands, an external territory of Australia
 Côte d'Ivoire (ISO country code)
 Channel Islands
 Channel Islands of California
 Carbonia-Iglesias, a province in southern Italy

Science, technology and mathematics

Biology and medicine
 cI protein, a repressor protein of Enterobacteria phage λ
 Cytoplasmic incompatibility, a reproductive system
 Cardiac index
 Ci protein, Cubitus interruptus -protein
 Coital incontinence
 Convergence insufficiency
 Corpulence index
 Cumulative incidence, used as a measure of disease frequency in epidemiology
 Cochlear implant
 Chemical injury syndrome, an increased sensitivity to common chemicals also called multiple chemical sensitivity.
 Chronic illness, a condition that is long-lasting or recurrent
 Contraindication

Computing
 .ci, the Internet country code top-level domain (ccTLD) for Côte d'Ivoire
 Common Interface, for a Conditional Access Module
 CI+, Common Interface Plus
 Computational intelligence
 Configuration item, the fundamental structural unit of a configuration management system
 Core Image, non-destructive image processing technology
 Continuous integration, a software-engineering practice of merging developer code into a main code base frequently
 CodeIgniter, a PHP framework

Earth science
 Cirrus cloud
 Convective instability

Mathematics
 Conditional independence, a type of relation of random variables in probability theory
 Confidence interval, an interval estimate of a population parameter used in statistics
 101 (number) (in Roman numerals)
 Compound interest
 Cosine integral (standard mathematical symbols "Ci" and "ci")

Physics
 Conical intersection, the location of a discrete degeneracy between two electronic states
 Curie (unit) (Symbol: Ci), a measurement of radioactivity named after Marie Curie
 Copenhagen interpretation, an interpretation of quantum mechanics
 Cubic inch, a unit of volume

Other uses in science and technology
 CI group, a type of carbonaceous chondrite meteorite
 Carrier interferometry, a radio and optical communication coding technology
 Chemical ionization, a technique used in mass spectrometry
 Configuration interaction, a post-Hartree–Fock method used in computational chemistry
 Contextual inquiry,  a user-centered design research method
 Collective intelligence, a subfield of sociology
 Colour Index International, a reference database of CI numbers for dyes and pigments
 Bavarian C I, a steam locomotive with the Royal Bavarian State Railways
 Compression ignition engine, another name for a diesel engine

Television
 Canadian Idol, a Canadian television series
 Law & Order: Criminal Intent, an American television series
 Crime & Investigation Network
 Crime & Investigation Network (Australia), Australian cable and satellite network focusing on Crime
 Crime & Investigation Network (Europe), a pan-European television channel
 Crime & Investigation Network (South East Asia)

Other uses
 Ci (poetry), a form of Chinese lyric poetry
 Qi, a central concept in several eastern philosophies
 Categorical imperative, in philosophy
 Colour Index International, a reference database
 Comprehensible input
 Contact improvisation, a dance technique
 CI, postnominal for Companion of the Order of the Crown of India
 Ci, a form of the surname Qi, of the Tungusic peoples

See also
 C1 (disambiguation)
 Cl (disambiguation)